Schultzichthys is a genus of pencil catfishes native to South America.

Species
There are currently two recognized species in this genus:
 Schultzichthys bondi (Myers, 1942)
 Schultzichthys gracilis Dahl, 1960

S. bondi is from the Amazon and Orinoco River basins, while S. gracilis is from the Guayabero River of the Orinoco River basin in Colombia. Schultzichthys species grow to between 2.6–3.7 centimetres (1.0–1.5 in) SL.

References

Trichomycteridae
Fish of South America
Freshwater fish genera
Catfish genera